Tokophobia is a significant fear of childbirth. It is a common reason why some women request an elective cesarean section. The fear often includes fear of injury to the baby, genital tract, or death. Treatment may occur via counselling.

It is a type of specific phobia. In 2000, an article published in the British Journal of Psychiatry described the fear of childbirth as a psychological disorder that has received little attention and may be overlooked.

Signs and symptoms
Phobia of childbirth, as with any phobia, can manifest through a number of symptoms including nightmares, difficulty in concentrating on work or family activities, panic attacks and psychosomatic complaints. Often the fear of childbirth motivates a request for an elective caesarean section. Fear of labor pain is strongly associated with the fear of pain in general; a previous complicated childbirth, or inadequate pain relief, may cause the phobia to develop. A fear of pregnancy itself can result in an avoidance of pregnancy or even, as birth control methods are never 100% effective, an avoidance of sexual intercourse or asking for sterilization, e.g. via hysterectomy.

Tokophobia is a distressing psychological disorder which may be overlooked by medical professionals; as well as specific phobia and anxiety disorders, tokophobia may be associated with depression and post-traumatic stress disorder. Recognition of tokophobia and close liaison with obstetricians or other medical specialists can help to reduce its severity and ensure efficient treatment.

Cause
Reasons for tokophobia can be complex. Women may fear for the infant's life, fear the unknown and fear the uncertainty of the labour and birth process. Women may develop tokophobia based on previous traumatic birth and delivery processes. Women may lack trust in obstetric services, or fear being left alone while in labour.

Primary
Primary tokophobia is the fear and deep-seated dread of childbirth in women who have never experienced birth. It may pre-date pregnancy and can start in adolescence or begin in pregnancy. This may relate back to their own mother's experience or be triggered by exposure to childbirth without adequate explanation at a young age. It may also be experienced by women who have been sexually abused or raped; childbirth could trigger flashbacks in women who are traumatised.

Secondary
Secondary tokophobia occurs in women who have experienced childbirth. The previous experience of birth may have been traumatic, or women may have experienced other traumatic life events and abuse.

Terminology
The term tokophobia was introduced in the medical literature in 2000. The word is from the Greek tokos, meaning childbirth and phobos, meaning fear.

It is also known as "maleusiophobia" (though this is certainly a variant of "maieusiophobia", from the Greek "maieusis", literally meaning "delivery of a woman in childbirth" but referring generally to midwifery), "parturiphobia" (from Latin parturire, meaning "to be pregnant"), and "lockiophobia".

See also
List of phobias
Blood-injection-injury type phobia
Psychiatric disorders of childbirth
Anxiety disorder

References

External links

Tokophobia: scared of giving birth?
Tokophobia: what it’s like to have a phobia of pregnancy and childbirth

Pathology of pregnancy, childbirth and the puerperium
Phobias